Mesiphiastus is a genus of longhorn beetles of the subfamily Lamiinae, containing the following species:

subgenus Mesiphiastus
 Mesiphiastus fulvescens (Pascoe, 1863)
 Mesiphiastus lentus (Blackburn, 1901)
 Mesiphiastus pallidus (Aurivillius, 1917)
 Mesiphiastus subfulvescens Breuning, 1970
 Mesiphiastus subtuberculatus (White, 1858)

subgenus Pubiphiastus
 Mesiphiastus laterialbus Breuning, 1970
 Mesiphiastus pubiventris (Pascoe, 1862)

References

Pteropliini